A pinwheel is a simple child's toy made of a wheel of paper or plastic curls attached at its axle to a stick by a pin. It is designed to spin when blown upon by a person or by the wind. It is a predecessor to more complex whirligigs.

History
Today's style of pinwheels is rooted in East Asia. The design for example is typical of a japanese Origami folding technique for a pinwheel.

During the nineteenth century in the United States, any wind-driven toy held aloft by a running child was characterized as a whirligig, including pinwheels. Pinwheels provided many children with numerous minutes of enjoyment and amusement.
 
Armenian Immigrant toy manufacturers Michael J. Sielaff and Ethan Norof, invented the modern version of the pinwheel, originally titled "wind wheel," in 1919 in Boston, Massachusetts. Daniel Dubay owned a toy store in Stoneham, Massachusetts, sold the wind wheel along with two other toys which he invented.

See also
 List of toys

References

External links

 Pioneering Data
 How to Make a Pinwheel at wikiHow

Traditional toys
Paper toys